Nelson Henry Baker (February 16, 1842 – July 29, 1936) was a Catholic priest and church administrator in the Buffalo, New York, area. At the time of his death in 1936, he had developed a "city of charity" at Our Lady of Victory Basilica in Lackawanna, New York. It consisted of a minor basilica, an infant home, a home for unwed mothers, a boys' orphanage, a boys' protectory, a hospital, a nurses' house, and a grade and high school.

Since 1986, the parish and the Diocese of Buffalo have been working to secure Baker's canonization. He was declared Venerable in 2011 by Pope Benedict XVI.

History

Early life and military service
Nelson Baker was born in Buffalo, New York, on February 16, 1842, to Lewis Becker (later Baker) and Caroline Donnellan, parents who were ethnic German and Irish, during a period when the rate of immigration was increasing from Europe. He was the second eldest of four sons. His father, a German Evangelical Lutheran, was a retired mariner. Lewis had opened a grocery and general goods store on Batavia Street (now called Broadway) in Buffalo. He is said to have instilled an astute business sense in young Nelson, who worked in the store after graduating from high school in 1858. Nelson's mother, Caroline, was a devout Irish Catholic, and the children were all baptized and raised as Catholic. Nelson was baptized a Roman Catholic in 1851, aged 9.

During the Civil War, Baker enlisted at age 21 as a Union soldier in early July 1863 as part of the 74th regiment of the New York State Militia. His regiment, which saw duty along the Pennsylvania front at the Battle of Gettysburg, was used to help quell the New York City draft riots in 1863. Crowds of mostly ethnic Irish rioted in protest of the draft; they attacked African Americans, their homes, and businesses in their resentment. Both groups competed for low-paying jobs.

Post-Civil War
After returning home from the war, Baker started a successful feed and grain business with his friend, Joseph Meyer, another veteran. He demonstrated a strong interest in religious matters and joined the St. Vincent DePaul Society. He began taking Latin classes at St. Michael's residence in Buffalo, which would become Canisius College in 1870.

Following a spiritual calling

In the summer of 1869, Baker took a steamer trip along the Lake Erie shoreline, using this time to sort out his life. By the time he returned to Buffalo, he had decided to enter the priesthood. His mother was delighted with the news; however, his father, brother, and former business partner Meyer were reserved.

Nelson Baker entered Our Lady of Angels Seminary (now Niagara University) on September 2, 1869. He was hospitalized for eighteen weeks when taken ill with erysipelas.

During his seminary years, Baker was part of a group of 108 that went on a pilgrimage to Rome in 1874 to support the restoration of the Papal States. En route, the group stopped in Paris, France, and toured the Our Lady of Victories Sanctuary. Several biographers of Baker note that this visit to French shrine initiated 
a lifelong devotion to Our Lady of Victory. In Rome the group briefly met Pope Pius IX at the Vatican.

Baker was ordained on March 19, 1876, by Bishop Stephen V. Ryan at St. Joseph's Cathedral in Buffalo, New York. He returned to Our Lady of the Angels the next day, to celebrate his first Mass. His first assignment was as an assistant to Father Thomas Hines at Limestone Hill, New York (now known as Lackawanna, New York). The parish there consisted of St. Patrick's church, St. Joseph's Orphanage, and St. John's Protectory. Father Baker would stay at this assignment until 1881 when he was transferred to St. Mary's Parish in Corning to assist the Reverend Peter Colgan. In 1882, Father Baker was transferred back to Limestone Hill as Superintendent.

"Padre of the Poor"

A few days after Father Baker returned to Limestone Hill, a group of creditors informed the priest that the three parish institutions had amassed a sizeable debt: they demanded immediate payment. He assured them that they would be repaid, citing his past dealings as a businessman. Using his remaining personal savings, he repaid part of the debt and entered into verbal agreements to repay the balance.

During this time, Father Baker developed the concept of "The Association of Our Lady of Victory." He took the step of writing to postmasters in towns across the country and requested the names and addresses of the Catholic women in their area. He wrote to these women, asking for their help in caring for the orphanage and protectory. They could join the "Association of Our Lady of Victory" for a donation of 25 cents a year.

Baker started a journal named The Annals of the Association of Our Lady of Victory in 1888. It was to be sent to Association members and to solicit help for the orphanage and protectory. The Annals was published until 1929, when the periodical was absorbed by The Victorian Magazine. This publication was produced by the Homes, which Baker headed, and it was published between 1895 and the early 1970s.

Baker's approach to raising money worked and the creditors were paid in full by June 1889. Father Baker also worked to ensure his parish did not go into debt again. In 1891, a natural gas well was discovered on the Our Lady of Victory Homes' land, which helped to offset heating costs. Local traditional stories claim that the discovery of this gas well was a miracle.

By 1901, the number of boys at St. John's Protectory tripled to 385. In St. Joseph's Orphanage, the total number of children doubled to 236. The city was attracting thousands of immigrants to work in new industries, and some were families in need.

Baker was named Vicar General of the Buffalo Diocese in 1904. The Vatican commended his religious leadership in 1923 by naming him Protonotary Apostolic ad instar Participantium, an honor accorded to only five other clergymen in the United States at that time.

Veneration
In 1987, Baker was named Servant of God. His remains were moved from the Holy Cross Cemetery in 1999 and reinterred under the Our Lady of Lourdes altar in the Our Lady of Victory Basilica and National Shrine.

On 14 January 2011, Pope Benedict XVI authorized the Congregation for the Causes of Saints to promulgate a decree recognizing Fr. Baker's "heroic virtue," and designating him Venerable.

Reception

Honored in his home community as "Buffalo's most influential citizen of the 20th century," Baker was honored by a major bridge on New York State Route 5 being named for him.

Baker remains a favorite local figure in the Buffalo area.

Many Buffalo children in the 60’s through 90’s can recall being told, “I’ll send you to Father Baker's” when they misbehaved.

See also
American Catholic Servants of God, Venerables, Beatified, and Saints
Our Lady of Victory Basilica

References

External links
Official Father Baker Information
Slaves of the Immaculate Heart of Mary: The Servant of God, Father Nelson Baker

1842 births
1936 deaths
Religious leaders from Buffalo, New York
People of New York (state) in the American Civil War
Canisius College alumni
American Roman Catholic priests
Burials in New York (state)
20th-century venerated Christians
Niagara University alumni
Union Army soldiers
People from Lackawanna, New York
Businesspeople from Buffalo, New York
Roman Catholic Diocese of Buffalo
Venerated Catholics by Pope Benedict XVI
Catholics from New York (state)
American venerated Catholics